Mark Andrew Henderson (born November 14, 1969) is an American former competition swimmer, Olympic champion, and former world record-holder. He is an Olympic gold medalist, three-time World champion, two-time Pan American Games champion, four-time Pan Pacific champion and five-time U.S. National champion. He competed at the 1996 Olympic Games in Atlanta, where he was the butterfly leg of the gold medal 4×100-meter medley relay, which set the world, Olympic, American, and U.S. Open records.

Career
Before his high school years, Olympic champion Mark Henderson swam for the Fort Washington Pool Assoc., Inc. in the Prince-Mont Swim League in Fort Washington, Prince Georges County Maryland where he still holds records in the 25 Butterfly 10 year old & Under in 1980 and the 100 Freestyle 15-18 year old in 1988.   While in high school, Henderson swam for Curl-Burke Swim Club (renamed to Nation's Capital Swim Club) and was coached by Jeff King. He attended college at the University of California, Berkeley where he swam for coach Nort Thornton's California Golden Bears swimming and diving team.

At the U.S. Olympic Trials in 1992, Henderson entered the meet ranked 2nd in the world in the 100m butterfly, but concentrated too much on his competition and took out his race much too fast (under world record pace at the 50m mark). He led the race to the final 10 meters where he "bonked" and dropped from first to seventh place.

Henderson returned to competition after an 8-month retirement with a vengeance. In 1993, Henderson won gold at the U.S. Open and Summer U.S. Nationals and another two gold medals at the Pan Pacific Championships. He finished his comeback year with a gold and two silvers at the inaugural Short Course World Championships in Palma, Majorca.

In 1994, Henderson joined the first USA Swimming resident team which was located at the Olympic Training Center in Colorado Springs, Colorado. It was run and coached by former world record holder Jonty Skinner. Over the next two years, Skinner coached Henderson to two National titles, a gold at the  World Championships, a gold and silver at the Pan Pacific Championships and two Pan American Gold medals. Henderson found redemption at the 1996 Olympic Trials by qualifying for the team in the 100 meter butterfly.

Upon his retirement from swimming, Henderson worked in the financial industry concentrating on Japan and U.S. equities for 15 years for the likes of JP Morgan Securities, Citigroup, and Janney Montgomery Scott. He retired from Wall Street in 2016 and is started a company called The Athletes Village which is building a platform to motivate and enhance the sports experience for youth athletes, their parents and coaches by connecting them through a Q&A/Search platform with elite athletes and experts in all the fields of sports (coaching, parenting, nutrition, psychology, strength training, injury prevention, etc.)

Henderson was married to Summer Sanders from 1997 to 2001. In 2006, Mark married Tamara Blanchard. They have two children: Brooke & Brady, a Bernese Mountain Dog (Harry) and a Double Dapple Dachshund (Gator). Mark and his family live in Bend, Oregon.

Charitable endeavors
Since his retirement from competitive swimming, Henderson has been a member of USA Swimming's Athlete Executive Council (AEC) (2000–2008), USA Swimming Board member (2000–2008), United States Olympic Committee Athlete Advisory Council (AAC) member (2000–2008), Chair of the AAC (2004–2008), current Board member of the Leo Brien Foundation, Olympic solidarity representative to Zimbabwe (2000–present), Co-founder of S.W.I.M (Swim With Inspiration and Motivation) learn-to-swim program for inner-city youth in San Francisco, and he is also a participant/ member in the Big Brother Program (1988–present) and Swim Across America. In 2008, Henderson was the recipient of the USA Swimming Athlete Appreciation Award. Mark has also been very active giving back to the global swimming community by answering questions from athletes, parents and coaches located all over the world on the platform The Athletes Village

See also
 List of Olympic medalists in swimming (men)
 List of University of California, Berkeley alumni
 List of World Aquatics Championships medalists in swimming (men)
 World record progression 4 × 100 metres medley relay

References

External links
 

1969 births
Living people
American male butterfly swimmers
American male freestyle swimmers
California Golden Bears men's swimmers
World record setters in swimming
Medalists at the FINA World Swimming Championships (25 m)
Olympic gold medalists for the United States in swimming
Swimmers at the 1995 Pan American Games
Swimmers at the 1996 Summer Olympics
World Aquatics Championships medalists in swimming
Medalists at the 1996 Summer Olympics
Pan American Games gold medalists for the United States
Pan American Games medalists in swimming
Medalists at the 1995 Pan American Games
20th-century American people
21st-century American people